Suprun is a surname of Ukrainian origin.

The following people share this last name:
 Liudmyla Suprun (born 1965), Ukrainian politician
 Mikhail Suprun (born 1955), Russian historian and professor
Stephen Christopher Suprun Jr. (born 1974), American 9-11 responder and politician
 Ulana Suprun (born 1963), Ukraine's Minister of Healthcare

See also
 

Ukrainian-language surnames